Brussels International Catholic School (BICS) is an independent pre-primary through secondary school, located in Brussels, Belgium. Offering Bilingual education to students, the academic program is designed for an international student body, with classes taught in the French and English language. Typically, pupils will learn the basics of reading and writing in French in the final year of the Pre-Primary section (ages five to six), whilst continuing to learn spoken English. The primary school follows the Cambridge Primary Programme (CPP) and Belgian approved curriculum.  

With the contents of liberal arts and sciences, BICS offers studies in mathematics, science, history, Latin, and English and French language and literature. BICS incorporates extracurricular within its programme, including options of tennis, swimming and performing arts.

After School Service 
A Garderie service is available at the school every day to support working parents. Depending on their age, children are placed in a monitored area and encouraged to perform schoolwork (guided by a teacher), read, or play creatively.

Curriculum 
Brussel International Catholic School followed in the Primary department is based upon a Belgian program for the French-speaking part and the Cambridge Primary for the English-speaking part. At the end of their six years of Primary school, students can take the Blgain' Examen Cantonal'.

The school is an accredited Cambridge University Examinations test center and as such offers the Cambridge International GCSE and A level curriculum.

References

External links 
 
 
 
 

Bilingual schools
International schools in Brussels
Secondary schools in Brussels
Catholic schools in Belgium
Educational organisations based in Belgium
Schools offering Cambridge International Examinations
Cambridge schools in Belgium
Educational institutions established in 2004
2004 establishments in Belgium